"Kiss Me, I'm Gone" is a song co-written and recorded by American country music artist Marty Stuart.  It was released in January 1994 as the first single from the album Love and Luck.  The song reached #26 on the Billboard Hot Country Singles & Tracks chart.  The song was written by Stuart and Bob DiPiero.

Chart performance

References

1994 singles
1994 songs
Marty Stuart songs
Songs written by Bob DiPiero
Songs written by Marty Stuart
Song recordings produced by Tony Brown (record producer)
MCA Records singles